The Torne River Railway Bridge is a dual gauge railway bridge between Haparanda, Sweden and Tornio, Finland; the 1524mm rails used for Finland, the 1435mm rails used for Sweden. A temporary ice river track was built over the Torne River in 1917. 

The current bridge was opened in 1919 and was the first direct connection between the towns until the road bridge opened in 1939. It was jointly built by the governments of Sweden and Finland, and by the railway. A small aerial lift was built in 1916 over the river to transport mail, because during parts of the year the ice was too strong for boats and too weak or too split up for walking, and this was the main gateway between Russia and Western Europe during World war One. The aerial lift was removed when the railway bridge was operating.

 
The bridge is painted white from the Finnish side to the international border, and is blue from there to the Swedish side. The dual gauge tracks continue over the bridge into railway marshalling yard in either country (a Swedish-gauge marshalling yard in Tornio, and a Finnish-gauge yard in Haparanda). Passenger trains also went over the bridge but have been withdrawn; the Finnish Railways ended passenger traffic to the Swedish side gradually between 1984 and 1988 while the last SJ passenger train left Haparanda in 1992. A train between Boden, Sweden and Haparanda was tried in the early 2000s, but was stopped as it was unprofitable. As of 2014, Green Cargo is shunting in Tornio, usually once or twice a day on weekdays and Saturdays. VR will shunt in Haparanda, if necessary. Current cross-border traffic consists of containerized goods and freight from Outokumpu. Cross-border freight transport is expected to increase on the Swedish side with construction of the new railway line between Kalix and Haparanda.

Technical details 
The bridge is 245m long, and was built as a swing bridge (although it was seldom-used as such) which rotated in the horizontal plane around the central pillar. The bridge was converted to a fixed structure on October 22, 1985.

References 

Railway bridges in Sweden
Railway bridges in Finland
Bridges completed in 1919
Tornio